Gramola is an Austrian music company, an offshoot of the British-Czech record producer of the same name.

The Austrian Gramola focuses on classical music. It initially focused on Austrian composers such as Joseph Haydn, Wolfgang Amadeus Mozart, Ludwig van Beethoven, and Franz Schubert. However, nowadays the company works on CD production and the promotion of young Austrian musicians, or musicians currently living in Austria.

Gramola has up to 70 new releases annually, predominantly of Austrian artists. Gramola currently collaborates with exil.arte, an organization dedicated to the reception, research, and preservation of works by Austrian composers and musicologists who were ostracized, exiled, or murdered during the National Socialism era.

References 

Classical music record labels
Austrian companies established in 1924
Austrian music industry
Companies based in Vienna